Maracujá mosaic virus (MarMV) is a virus that infects Passiflora species. Symptoms include leaf mosaic and  crinkle. Virus particles are 320 nm long and 18 nm in diameter. Transmission occurs by contact between plants.

References

Tobamovirus